Ms. Vocalist is the ninth studio album by American singer-songwriter Debbie Gibson. Released on November 3, 2010 exclusively in Japan by Sony Music Japan, the album features Gibson's English-language covers of popular male-oriented Japanese songs. In addition, the album includes a duet with Mr. Big vocalist Eric Martin and two re-recordings of her number one hit "Lost in Your Eyes", with one version sung in Japanese. A deluxe edition release features four extra re-recordings of songs from her 1987 debut album Out of the Blue, plus a DVD featuring interviews and the music video for "I Love You".

Ms. Vocalist is the female counterpart of Eric Martin's Mr. Vocalist album series.

The album peaked at No. 71 on Oricon's Weekly Albums chart.

Ms. Vocalist was included in the 2017 box set We Could Be Together, making it the first time it was released in western markets.

Track listing

Charts

References

External links
 
 
 

Ms. Vocalist
Ms. Vocalist
Covers albums
Sony Music Entertainment Japan albums